Lucien Fabre (14 February 1889 – 26 November 1952) was a French novelist, essayist, and poet.

Personal life 
Fabre was born on 14 February 1889 in France's River Garonne region in Pampelonne, and died in Paris on 26 November 1952.

Career

Publication of Einstein's theories

Fabre was a businessman, artist, and friend of the poet Paul Valéry, Leon-Paul Fargue, and the violinist Jacques Thibaud.
He associated with socialists, particularly Léon Blum; in Carmaux he met Jean Jaurès, a socialist politician from the same region as Fabre.  Fabre married a young woman of one of the richest families of the Champ de Mars in Paris.

During 1921, Fabre published a popular science book titled Einstein's theories: a new face in the world with a "foreword" attributed to Albert Einstein.  The preface text was taken from a letter by Einstein to Maurice Solovine, which was later purchased by Fabre.  After publication, Einstein complained to the editor, resulting in the preface of the book being withdrawn for the second edition (1922), and replaced with a derogatory comment directed at Einstein  

Fabre is now largely forgotten, probably because of his extreme eclecticism which is no longer popular; a characteristic which made his style difficult to read. He kept all his life an affection for country life. Several of his books recreate the atmosphere and character which prevailed in this austere and poor land.

Awards
 1923 Prix Goncourt for Rabevel ou le Mal des ardents.
 1948 Grand Prix of Histoire Académie française for Jeanne d'Arc.

Works
 Les théories d'Einstein: une nouvelle figure du monde Paris: Payot, 1921.
 Bassesse de Venise, précédé de La Traversée de l'Europe en avion et du légat (1924). Gallimard (essays).
 Le Ciel de l'oiseleur (1934), Gallimard (essays).
 Connaissance de la déesse (1924), préface de Paul Valéry. Gallimard (poetry).
 Le Paradis des amants (1931), Collection blanche, Gallimard (novel).
 Rabevel ou le mal des ardents (1923), trois volumes, Collection blanche, Gallimard (novel).
 Le Rire et les rieurs (1929), Collection blanche, Gallimard (essays).
 Le Tarramagnou (1925), Collection blanche, Gallimard (novel).
 Vanikoro (1925). Gallimard (poetry).
 Dieu est innocent: tragédie, Lucien Fabre, Paul Valéry, Nagel, 1946.
 Jeanne d'Arc (1948), Tallandier.

References

1889 births
1952 deaths
People from Tarn (department)
Writers from Occitania (administrative region)
French male novelists
20th-century French novelists
20th-century French male writers
Prix Goncourt winners
Burials at Père Lachaise Cemetery